The highest-paid players in Major League Baseball (MLB) from the 2023 Major League Baseball season are New York Mets' starting pitchers Max Scherzer and Justin Verlander with an annual salary of $43.33 million. MLB does not have a hard salary cap, instead employing a luxury tax which applies to teams whose total payroll exceeds certain set thresholds for a given season. Free agency did not exist in MLB prior to the end of the reserve clause in the 1970s, allowing owners before that time to wholly dictate the terms of player negotiations and resulting in significantly lower salaries. Babe Ruth, widely regarded as one of the greatest baseball players ever, earned an estimated $856,850 ($ inflation-adjusted from 1934 dollars) over his entire playing career. When asked whether he thought he deserved to earn $80,000 a year ($ inflation-adjusted), while the president, Herbert Hoover, had a $75,000 salary, Ruth famously remarked, "What the hell has Hoover got to do with it? Besides, I had a better year than he did."

Alex Rodriguez has signed two record-breaking contracts over the course of his career. First, he signed a $252 million, 10-year contract with the Texas Rangers in December 2000 ($ inflation-adjusted from 2000 dollars). Sandy Alderson called the deal "stupefying", while Sports Illustrated noted that Rodriguez's early salaries under the contract ($21 million) would be greater than the annual payroll of the entire Minnesota Twins team that year ($15.8 million). The deal was the largest sports contract in history, doubling the total value of Kevin Garnett's $126 million National Basketball Association contract (the previous record holder) and more than doubling Mike Hampton's $121 million contract, the previous MLB record which had been signed just days before. The Rangers later traded Rodriguez to the Yankees in exchange for Alfonso Soriano before the 2004 season, though they agreed to pay $67 million of the $179 million outstanding on the contract. Despite this, he opted out of the remainder of his deal after the 2007 season and renegotiated a new $275 million, 10-year agreement with the Yankees, breaking his own record for the largest sports contract. Under this deal, Rodriguez also received $6 million when he tied the career home run total of Willie Mays (660), and would have received $6 million more had he tied Babe Ruth (714), Hank Aaron (755), and Barry Bonds (762), along with another $6 million for breaking Bonds' mark.

First base was the highest-paid position in 2010; regular starters at that position earned an average salary of $9,504,165 in compared to an overall average of $3,014,572. Pitcher Nolan Ryan was the first player to earn an annual salary above $1 million, signing a $4.5 million, 4-year contract with the Houston Astros in 1979. Kirby Puckett and Rickey Henderson signed the first contracts which paid an average of $3 million a year in November 1989, in 1990 Jose Canseco signed for 5 years and $23.5 million, making him the first player to earn an average of $4 million a year. It was until 2010 when the MLB average salary rose above that same mark. Five of the twenty highest-paid players in 2013 were members of the Yankees. Their team payroll for 2013 was $228,835,490, roughly $12 million above the second-largest Los Angeles Dodgers. The Yankees have drawn criticism for their payroll, with some claiming it undermines the parity of MLB.

Key

Highest annual salaries in 2023 
This table refers to the salary for 2023 alone, not the overall average value or amount of the contract.

Career earnings as of the end of the 2023 season

Earnings up to date as of the end of the 2022 season.

Salary progression

This list documents the progression of the highest average annual value contracts/contract extensions.

See also 

 Highest-paid NBA players by season
 List of player salaries in the NHL
 List of highest-paid American television stars
 List of highest-paid film actors
 List of salaries

Footnotes
  "Earnings" as discussed here refers to salaries paid to players under MLB contracts and does not include advertising or other sources of income. All values are listed in nominal dollars.
  "Average annual value" is calculated as the total value of a contract (less bonuses) divided by the number of years. A $20 million/2-year contract would have an average annual value of $10 million, even if the player actually received $9 million one season and $11 million in the other. This also does not include contracts for less than a season prorated in value for a full season such as Roger Clemens' 2006 and 2007 contracts. All values are listed in nominal dollars.
  Dave Winfield initially negotiated a 10-year deal in 1980 worth a projected $25 million ($2.5 million per year). However, Yankees owner George Steinbrenner reportedly had not fully understood a cost of living adjustment provision in it and the 10-year contract was renegotiated a few months later. The final precise value is unclear, although it fell between $20 and $25 million in total value ($2–2.5 million a year).
 Hershiser and Frank Viola both won the 1988 Cy Young Award and Viola signed an identically sized $7.9 million, 3-year contract two months after Hershiser.
 Rickey Henderson signed a $12 million, 4-year contract with the Oakland Athletics on November 28, 1989, 6 days after Puckett signed his $9 million, 3-year contract.
  Roger Clemens signed a contract extension during the 2000 season covering 2001 and 2002 along with a player option for 2003. Clemens was paid $10.3 million each year for 2001 and 2002, with the same $10.3 million available if he elected to play in 2003 under his option. However, Clemens also received $10.3 million if he rejected the option. As a result, he could effectively collect the full $30.9 million of contract value for only two years of play ($15.45 million annually). However, the Yankees valued this deal as a $10.3 million annually, three-year deal. He became a free agent after the 2002 season and ultimately re-signed with the Yankees for a new, one-year contract in which they bought out the previous option.

References

Bibliography

 
 
 

Major League Baseball labor relations
MLB players
Major league baseball